A Doll's House is an American drama television film that premiered on NBC on November 15, 1959, as part of the Hallmark Hall of Fame anthology series. It is directed and produced by George Schaefer, from a teleplay by James Costigan, based on Henrik Ibsen's classic play of the same name. The film stars Julie Harris and Christopher Plummer, who previously co-starred in Little Moon of Alban.

Plot
Nora Helmer has years earlier committed a forgery in order to save the life of her authoritarian husband Torvald. Now she is being blackmailed and lives in fear of her husband's finding out and of the shame such a revelation would bring to his career. But when the truth comes out, Nora is shocked to learn where she really stands in her husband's esteem.

Cast
 Julie Harris as Nora Helmer
 Christopher Plummer as Torvald Helmer
 Hume Cronyn as Nils Krogstad
 Eileen Heckart as Kristine Linde
 Jason Robards Jr. as Dr. Rank
 Katharine Raht as Anne-Marie
 Mildred Trares as Helene
 Maggie King as Emmy
 Randy Gaynes as Bobby
 Richard E. Thomas as Ivor

References

External links
 
 

1959 films
1959 drama films
1959 television films
1959 television plays
1950s American films
1950s English-language films
American drama television films
American films based on plays
Films about marriage
Films based on A Doll's House
Films directed by George Schaefer
Hallmark Hall of Fame episodes
NBC network original films
Television shows based on plays